Love Peace & Fuck is the 2001 debut album by Julian Cope’s side project Brain Donor, released by Impresario records on CD and double LP. It was produced and directed by Cope with the help of long term collaborator Thighpaulsandra. The album was recorded by the power trio of Cope, lead guitarist Doggen Foster and drummer Kevin Bales, both formerly of Spiritualized. Cope plays bass, a role he had not assumed in a band context since The Teardrop Explodes in the early 1980s.

The lyrics center on Cope's then obsession with ancient, pagan cultures, including references to Celtic and Norse folklore, while the music inclines towards The Stooges and 1980s British Heavy Metal. Love Peace & Fuck was described by music critic Aaron Badgley as "pure noise" and "garage rock, prog rock, and...'Krautrock' all rolled into a 2001 sound".

Two singles were released from the album, "She Saw Me Coming" and "Get Off Your Pretty Face".

Track listing

Note

"You Take the Credit" is listed as a separate track on the album cover.

Personnel
Credits adapted from the album's liner notes.

Musicians
Julian Cope — vocals, bass, guitar
Anthony "Doggen" Foster (credited as Dogman) — lead guitar 
Kevin "Kevlar" Bales — drums
Technical
Julian Cope — producer, directed by
David Wrench — recorded by
John-Paul Braddock — recorded by
Thighpaulsandra — mastering, synthesized by
Christopher Patrick "Holy" McGrail — cover art, illustration
Lisa Bennett — design

References

External links
 Love Peace & Fuck on Discogs.com. Retrieved on 2 May 2018.

2001 debut albums
Julian Cope albums